Maja Schöne (born 1 January 1976) is a German actress. She is best known for portraying Hannah Kahnwald in the Netflix TV show Dark.

Biography 
Schöne was born in Stuttgart and has an older brother. After graduating from high school, she completed a stage and director's internship. In 1997, she decided to become an actress and began studying at the Westphalian Drama School in Bochum, a program that she completed in 2001. Schöne moved to Hamburg in February 2001 and began appearing in Friedrich Schiller plays. In 2002 she received the Young Talent Promotion Award from the Friends of the German Playhouse. From 2007 to 2009 she acted in several roles at the Schauspiel Köln, the first being Brunhild in Friedrich Hebbel's Die Nibelungen. For this role, she received the award for best actress at the Theater Festival NRW. Since 2009 she has had an engagement at the Thalia Theater in Hamburg.

In 2004, she made her cinema debut in Mark Schlichter's film Cowgirl, alongside Alexandra Maria Lara, which earned her a nomination for the Undine Award. From 2008 to 2013, she was in the Stuttgart episodes of the crime series Tatort, playing the wife of the investigator Bootz. In 2011 she starred in Brigitte Bertele's film  as a rape victim in search of retribution; for this role, she was awarded the German Actor Award for Best Actress.

She began her screen career in the German TV movie Schluss mit lustig!  She appeared in a number of television series in her country, appearing in the late 2000s in film productions such as Buddenbrooks, and Zarte Parasiten. She appeared in the Tatort series between 2005 and 2015, playing Felix Klare's wife. She starred in the TV miniseries Neu in unserer Familie in 2017 as the matriarch who has children by two different men, and they all live in the same household. In 2017 she achieved international recognition as a member of the main cast of the Netflix sci-fi family drama television series Dark, in which she plays the role of Hannah Kahnwald.

She is married to the actor Carlo Ljubek and has a daughter.

Filmography 

 2001: Schluss mit lustig!
 2004: Doppelter Einsatz: Der Fluch des Feuers
 2004: Das Zimmermädchen
 2004: Cowgirl
 2004: Der Traum vom Süden
 2004: Aller Tage Abend
 2005: Tatort: Im Alleingang
 2005: Mörderische Erpressung
 2005: Dow Jane Index
 2006: Stubbe-Von Fall zu Fall: Verhängnisvolle Freundschaft
 2007: Polizeiruf 110: Dunkler Sommer
 2007: Tatort: In eigener Sache
 2007: Tatort: Hart an der Grenze
 2007: Der Dicke: Angstpartie
 2007: 1. Mai – Helden bei der Arbeit
 2008: KDD – Kriminaldauerdienst: Chancen
 2008: Buddenbrooks
 2008: Tatort: Das Mädchen Galina
 2008: Tatort: Oben und unten
 2008: Tatort: Tödliche Tarnung
 2009: Zarte Parasiten
 2009: Wanna Be (short film)
 2009: 
 2009: Tatort: Blutgeld
 2009: Tatort: Altlasten
 2010: KDD – Kriminaldauerdienst: Chancen
 2011: Polizeiruf 110 – Feindbild
 2011: 
 2012: Stralsund – Blutige Fährte
 2012: Tatort: Spiel auf Zeit
 2013: Bella Block: Hundskinder
 2014: Frau Roggenschaubs Reise
 2014: Sternstunde ihres Lebens
 2015: Blochin – Die Lebenden und die Toten (TV miniseries)
 2015: Tatort: Preis des Lebens
 2016: Neu in unserer Familie
 2017: Neu in unserer Familie 2 (TV film)
 2018: Tatort: Du allein
 2018: A Dark in the Light
 2019: Eine fremde Tochter 
 2017–2020: Dark (TV series)
 2020: Der Mann der die Welt aß

References

External links 

Maja Schöne at filmportal.de
Agency profile at Hoerstermann agency

1976 births
Living people
German television actresses
21st-century German actresses
Actresses from Stuttgart